Naagam or Nagam may refer to:

 Nagam, Jammu and Kashmir, India, a town and municipality
 Naagam (1985 film), a Tamil-language film directed by Chozha Rajan
 Naagam (1991 film), a Malayalam-language film directed by KS Gopalakrishnan
 Julie Nagam, Canadian scholar, artist and curator 
 Nagam Janardhan Reddy (born 1949), Indian politician